The Noble Damsel Stakes is a Grade III American Thoroughbred horse race for fillies and mares age three-years-old and older run over a distance of one mile on the turf held annually in October at Belmont Park in Elmont, New York. The event offers a purse of $200,000.

History

The event was inaugurated on 28 September 1985 as The Lexiable Stakes  at one mile in distance over the dirt and was won by the Irish bred filly Alabama Nana who was trained by the US Hall of Fame trainer D. Wayne Lukas in a time of 1:35.

The following year the event was run in split divisions on the turf over a distance of  miles. 

In 1988 the event was classified as Grade III.

In 1989 the event was renamed to the Noble Damsel Stakes in honor of Noble Damsel, who won the 1982 New York Handicap at Belmont Park.

In 1997 the distance of the event was shortened to one mile In 2010 the conditions of the event were changed from a handicap to a stakes race with base weights with allowances.

Records
Speed record:
 1 mile: 1:32.06 – Viadera (GB) (2020)
  miles: 1:39.59 – Irish Linnet (1994)

Margins:
  lengths – Irish Linnet (1994)

Most wins:
 2 – Irish Linnet (1994, 1995)

Most wins by a jockey:
 6 – John Velazquez (1994, 1995, 1996, 1998, 2004, 2019)

Most wins by a trainer:
 5 – Christophe Clement (1999, 2005, 2009, 2012, 2014)
 5 – Chad C. Brown (2016, 2017, 2018, 2019, 2020)

Most wins by an owner:
 2 – Austin Delaney  (1994, 1995)

Winners

Legend:

 
 

Notes:

§ Ran as an entry

See also
 List of American and Canadian Graded races

References

Horse races in New York (state)
Turf races in the United States
Graded stakes races in the United States
Grade 3 stakes races in the United States
Belmont Park
1985 establishments in New York (state)
Recurring sporting events established in 1985